Srithika Saneesh is an Indian actress who appears in Tamil films and television serials.

Biography
Srithika lived and studied in Malaysia, where her father was a businessman, before she settled in Chennai. She was able to find roles in commercials through her elder sister Sudha, who worked as a TV hostess and currently works in serials as well. She went on to appear in films, including Vennila Kabadi Kuzhu and Madurai to Theni Vazhi Aandipatti  (2009). But it's on the small screen that she had her big break: from 2010 to 2015, she played the role of Malar in the popular soap opera Nadhaswaram. She has since acted in other TV shows, including Mamiyar Thevai, Uravugal Sangamam and Kula Deivam.

Television
Serials

Shows

Advertisements
Kinder Joy - Tamil

Movies
Actress
 Mahesh, Saranya Matrum Palar (2008)
 Vennila Kabadi Kuzhu (2009)
 Madurai to Theni Vazhi Aandipatti (2009)
 Venghai (2011)
 Balu Thambi Manasile (2012)
Dubbing artist
 Saranya Mohan - Yaaradi Nee Mohini (2008), Eeram (2009)

Awards
Sun Kudumbam Awards 2012 – Best Marumagal for Nadhaswaram
Sun Kudumbam Awards 2014 – Devathaigal (Special award) for Nadhaswaram

References

External links 
 
 Srithika Interview in Ananda Vikatan

Living people
Place of birth missing (living people)
Indian film actresses
Indian soap opera actresses
Indian television actresses
Actresses in Tamil cinema
Actresses in Tamil television
21st-century Indian actresses
Actresses from Chennai
1986 births